Salempur may refer to:

 Salempur, Gaya, a village in Gaya district, Bihar, India
 Salempur, Saran, a village in Saran district, Bihar, India
 Salempur, Uttar Pradesh, a town in India
 Salempur (Lok Sabha constituency), the parliamentary constituency for the town
 Salempur, Gosainganj, a village in Lucknow district, Uttar Pradesh, India
 Salempur, Kakori, a village in Lucknow district, Uttar Pradesh, India
 Salempur, Nepal, a village development committee in Sarlahi District

See also
 Salempur Masanda, a village in Jalandhar District in Punjab, India